Randy Gregory (born November 23, 1992) is an American football outside linebacker for the Denver Broncos of the National Football League (NFL). He played college football at Nebraska, and was drafted by the Dallas Cowboys in the second round of the 2015 NFL Draft.

Early years
Gregory was born in Jacksonville, Florida and moved seven different times. His father, Ken Gregory, played college football at Northwestern. He attended Hamilton Southeastern High School in Fishers, Indiana, where he was a two-sport athlete in football and basketball.

In football, he posted 92 tackles and 17 sacks. Following his senior season, he was ranked as one of the top 15 players in the state of Indiana. In addition to numerous scholarship offers in football, Gregory also drew some interest from Division I basketball teams.

College career
Gregory enrolled at Arizona Western College. As a freshman in 2011, he had 82 tackles, nine sacks, 21 tackles for loss, 3 forced fumbles and 2 fumble recoveries, while helping the team reach the NJCAA title game. As a sophomore in 2012, he missed the entire season due to a broken leg.

He originally committed to Purdue University, but was academically ineligible and decided to attend the University of Nebraska–Lincoln instead. As a sophomore in 2013, he started 10-of-13 games, recording 66 tackles (19 for loss), 10.5 sacks, 18 quarterback hurries, one pass defensed, one forced fumble, one fumble recovery and one interception that he returned for a touchdown. His 10.5 sacks led the Big Ten Conference. He was named a first-team All-Big Ten and was Nebraska's Defensive MVP.

Sporting News listed Gregory as their preseason number 5 player in college football for 2014. As a junior, he started 10 out of 11 games, while making 54 tackles (fifth on the team), 10 tackles for loss (third on the team), 7 sacks (led the team), 16 quarterback hurries, one interception, 3 passes defensed, one forced fumble and 2 blocked kicks. He missed the second game against Fresno State University with an injury. He decided to forgo his senior season and enter the 2015 NFL Draft.

Collegiate statistics

Professional career

As early as May 2014, Gregory was projected as a high first-round selection in the 2015 NFL Draft by various mock drafts. However, after failing the 2015 NFL Scouting Combine drug test for marijuana, he was looked over during the first round of the draft and fell heavily to the second round, until being selected by the Dallas Cowboys (60th overall).

Dallas Cowboys
In 2015, although he showed promise during preseason (three sacks in three games) and in the season opener against New York Giants (three quarterback pressures in only 18 snaps), he suffered a high ankle sprain in the fourth quarter that forced him to miss the next four games and held back his development. He made his return to the field in week 7 against the Giants; however, it wasn't until the team's week 10 loss to the Tampa Bay Buccaneers that Gregory posted his first professional tackle, making one solo and one assisted tackle in the game. He didn't have a sack during the season, but still managed 16 quarterback pressures (fourth on the team) and one tackle-for-loss.

On February 19, 2016, Gregory was suspended for the first four games of the season due to violating the league's substance abuse policy. A few months later, Gregory failed a second drug test, checked into an undisclosed treatment facility and was removed from the team's roster. He received an additional 10-game suspension, making him ineligible to return to the Cowboys until December 19.

On November 11, it was reported that Gregory supposedly failed another drug test and was facing a year-long suspension added on to his current 14-game suspension.

Gregory was activated from his consecutive suspensions on December 26, prior to a Week 16 matchup against the Detroit Lions. His year-long suspension was not in place at the time so he could make his 2016 season debut. In the game, he was able to play through an oblique strain he suffered in the second quarter , while posting two tackles and one quarterback hurry. With the team suffering multiple injuries along the defensive line, he started in the last game of the season against the Philadelphia Eagles, recording his first career sack, one tackle for loss, a quarterback hurry and was second on the team with seven tackles.

Although there was a possibility that the NFL would delay the appeal hearing for his latest suspension and allow him to play in the postseason, the meeting was held on January 3, 2017, with the league officially announcing that Gregory would be suspended for the playoffs and at least for one season on January 5, after allegedly missing a scheduled drug test. On July 17, 2018, Gregory was reinstated by the NFL on a conditional basis, allowing him to report to training camp and participate in meetings, but is not permitted to participate in games or practices until the conditions are met. He was fully reinstated by the league the following week. On August 30, he visited with the NFL's chief medical director in what was reported to be a proactive meeting to discuss his treatment and progress. In early September, a report surfaced in the media that Gregory may have suffered a substance abuse relapse during the month of August. Although he was called to the New York League Headquarters for a private meeting, no further discipline was applied.

On February 26, 2019, Gregory was suspended indefinitely by the NFL for violating the league's substance abuse policy and the terms of his conditional reinstatement. On April 2, 2019, the Cowboys extended Gregory's contract through the 2020 season.

In March 2020, ESPN reported that Gregory filed for reinstatement with the NFL. On September 7, 2020, Gregory was conditionally reinstated from suspension, and the Cowboys were given a roster exemption for him through the first six games of the season. On September 8, he signed a one-year extension. He was activated from the roster exemption on October 20, 2020.

In Week 7 he made his season debut against the Washington Football Team. In Week 12 on Thanksgiving, he recorded his first career multi-sack game, with two sacks on Alex Smith during the 41–16 loss against the Washington Football Team. He appeared in 10 games, registering 17 tackles (3 for loss), 3.5 sacks (tied for third on the team), 16 quarterback hurries (third on the team), one pass breakup and three forced fumbles (third on the team). In Week 16 against Philadelphia Eagles, he had 3 tackles (one for loss), 1.5 sacks, 2 quarterback hurries, 3 forced fumbles and one pass breakup. He emerged in the second half of the season and began taking playing time at right defensive end from starter Aldon Smith. He finished with 17 tackles (3 for loss), 3.5 sacks, 16 quarterback pressures, one pass breakup and 3 forced fumbles.

Gregory entered the 2021 season as a starting defensive end for the Cowboys. He suffered a calf injury during practice before Week 10 and was placed on injured reserve on November 11, 2021. He was activated on December 11. On December 12, 2021 against the Washington Football Team he recorded a sack, a forced fumble, and his first career interception on a ball that he deflected at the line and caught himself, returning it for 12 yards.

Denver Broncos
During free agency in 2022, it was reported that Gregory had signed a five-year contract extension with the Cowboys. However, there was a disagreement in the contract language that allowed the Cowboys to claim any bonuses if a player is fined or suspended, which led Gregory to instead sign a five-year, $70 million contract with the Denver Broncos. He suffered a knee injury in Week 4 and was placed on injured reserve on October 4, 2022. He was activated on December 17. He was suspended for one game nine days later. His suspension was overturned a day later. He finished the season with two sacks, 12 tackles, and two forced fumbles through six games.

NFL career statistics

Personal life
Gregory has a daughter, Sophia Gregory, born in fall 2016 and a son, Roman Gregory in 2019.

References

External links
Nebraska Cornhuskers bio 
Dallas Cowboys bio

1992 births
Living people
Players of American football from Jacksonville, Florida
American football defensive ends
Arizona Western Matadors football players
Nebraska Cornhuskers football players
People from Fishers, Indiana
Dallas Cowboys players
Denver Broncos players